Ed Roberts may refer to:

Ed Roberts (activist) (1939–1995), American leader of the disability rights movement
Ed Roberts (computer engineer) (1941–2010), American computer pioneer
Ed Roberts (poet) (born 1958), American poet, writer and publisher
Ed Roberts (Emmerdale), fictional character on the television series Emmerdale

See also
Eddie Roberts (disambiguation)
Ed Robertson (born 1970), Canadian lead singer of Barenaked Ladies
Edward Roberts (disambiguation)